Geophis bellus is a snake of the colubrid family. It is endemic to Panama.

References

Geophis
Snakes of North America
Reptiles described in 2003